Mike Southon BSC is a British cinematographer. He is a past President of the British Society of Cinematographers. As well as films, he has shot more than 250 music videos and 200 television commercials.

Films 
1985  Captive Paul Mayersberg c
1986  Gothic Ken Russell c
1986 Vardo (1986 film) Matthew Jacobs ?; short/26m
1987 The Minisagas [ep #1 "Crime in the City" & #2 "People Are the Same the Universe Over", dir by James Scott; ep #3 "Stateside: The Epic Bestseller That Shocked America" & #4 "Retirement Hobbies for Octogenarians" dir by Gerry Feeny; ep #5 "The Nihilist's Double Vision" & #6 "The Best Ever Nuclear Fall Out Shelter", dir by Syd Macartney] b&w-c; 6 short films for theatrical screenings
1987 Aria seg #9 "Louise: Depuis le jour" dir by Derek Jarman b&w-c; 10 seg; cph: Christopher Hughes
1987 Paperhouse Bernard Rose c; hph: Peter Allwork
1988 Spies Inc./S.P.O.O.K.S./Spies, Lies and Alibis/Code Name: Chaos Antony Thomas c
1988 Queen of Hearts Jon Amiel c; uwph: Charles Lagus
1989 Chicago Joe and the Showgirl Bernard Rose c
1990 A Kiss Before Dying James Dearden c
1990 Little Man Tate Jodie Foster c; 2uc: Tony Jannelli
1991 Wuthering Heights Peter Kosminsky c
1993 Roommates Peter Yates c; addph: Sandi Sissel & Victor Hammer
1994 The Run of the Country Peter Yates p/c; aph: Adam Dale
1995 The Final Cut Roger Christian c; + small part
1996 Air Bud Charles Martin Smith c; 2uc: Dave Frazee & William Waring
1998 Air Bud: Golden Receiver/Air Bud 2 Richard Martin c; addph: Michael Bonvillain (+ 2uc) & Glen Winter; stunt unit ph: Todd Elyzen
1998 The Duke/Hubert Philip Spink c
1999 Tricks Iris & Jim Klein c
1999 Sorted Alexander Jovy s35/c
2000 Replicant Ringo Lam c; 2uc: Brian Pearson
2001 Bandido Roger Christian c; cph: Kristian Bernier; 2uc: Lars Herrmann
2002 MXP: Most Xtreme Primate/MVP 3 More Monkey Business Robert Vince c/V
2002 Air Bud: Spikes Back Mike Southon c
2003 Spymate Robert Vince c; addph: Eric J. Goldstein
2003 Pursued Kristoffer Tabori c; 2uc: Anthony Metchie
2005 Beneath Dagen Merrill c; 2uc: Mathias Herndl
2005 Air Buddies Robert Vince c/V; 2uc: Larry Lynn
2006 Kill Kill Faster Faster Gareth Maxwell Roberts c; co-addph; ph: Ruzbeh Babol
2006 A Neutral Corner Emily Greenwood scope/c; short/14m
2009 Nutcracker: The Untold Story Andrei Konchalovsky c; 2uc: Balázs Bélafalvy & Mike Frift
2010 Spooky Buddies Robert Vince
2011 St. George's Day (Frank harper)

Television
1977 The Madonna and the Volcano [prod: Mike Radford doc/54m; cph: John Hooper; ep 3-part Omnibus Italia season (part of BBC-TV arts series 'Omnibus')
1977 Hospital [Roger Mills] 9-part doc series for BBC-TV; cph: Grenville Dobson
1978 Seeing Through Drawing [Michael Dibb] doc/119m; cph: John Hooper; ep BBC-TV arts series The Lively Arts
1979 A Change of Sex [ep #1 'George - The Big Decision' & #2 'Julia - The First Year' dir by David Pearson] 3-part series/16mm, 1980; cph (#2): David Feig; ep #3 ph by David Feig & Keith Taylor; followed by 4 ep in 1994 & 1999
1980 In the Making [ep #2 (19m) 'Lute Making - Stephen Gottlieb' & #7 (19m) 'Theatre Design - Pamela Howard'; series prod: John Read] 9-part BBC-TV doc series; cph (#2): Alec Curtis, a.o.
1980 Dallas The Big Store [Jana Bokova] doc/53m; ep (1981) BBC-TV arts series Omnibus
1980 Chelsea Hotel [Nigel Finch] doc/55m; ep (1981) BBC-TV arts series Arena
1980 Feeling for the Sound [Dave Hutt] mus doc/29m; ep #4 of 6-part series Sounds Different
1980 Dire Straits [Nigel Finch] mus doc/58m; ep BBC-TV arts series Arena
1980 When the Dancing Had to Stop [series prod: Leslie Megahey] doc/60m; cph: Colin Waldeck; ep BBC-TV arts series Omnibus
1981 The Leader's Tale [prod: Tony Laryea] doc/48m; ep #12 of 12-part BBC-TV series Tales of Twelve Cities
1981 Behind the Scenes with... John Glenister [Christopher Swann] doc/29m; ep #8 of 10-part BBC-TV series Behind the Scenes with...
1981 The Great Art Dictator [prod: David Wallace] doc/54m
1981 Desert Island Discs [Anthony Wall] doc/47m; ep (1982) BBC-TV arts series Arena; repeated in January 1992 with new introduction
1982 Survivalists [prod: Paul Hamann] doc/48m; ep BBC-TV series The Tuesday Documentary
1982 Upon Westminster Bridge [Anthony Wall] doc/52m; ep BBC-TV arts series Arena
1982 Burroughs: The Movie Howard Brookner doc/b&w-c/85m; cph: Tom DiCillo, Richard Camp, James Lebovitz, a.o.; ep (1983) BBC-TV arts series Arena; also released theatrically
1982 Bergerac [ep #12 "Always Leave Them Laughing" dir by Peter Smith] 87-part series, 1981–91; 2nd season, 1983
1982 Where's the Key? [David Wheatley] tvm/65m
1983 Kurt Vonnegut [: So It Goes] [Nigel Finch] doc/60m; ep BBC-TV arts series Arena
1983 Borges and I [David Wheatley] doc/75m; ep BBC-TV arts series Arena
1983 Sunset People [Jana Bokova] doc/110m; ep (1984) BBC-TV arts series Arena
1984 The Caravaggio Conspiracy [Nigel Finch] doc/60m; ep BBC-TV arts series Arena
1984 Beat This! A Hip Hop History [Alan Yentob & Dick Fontaine] doc/58m; addph: Sandi Sissel; special BBC-TV arts series Arena
1984 Big Deal [ep #1 'Red Lady, Black Night' dir by Brian Lighthill] 30-part series, 1984–86; 1st series (10 ep)
1984 The Sword and the Shield [Ian Duncan] doc/60m; cph: Peter Chapman; ep #5 of 8-part BBC-TV doc series SOE
1984 Francis Bacon [: The Brutality of Fact] [prod: Michael Blackwood] doc/58m/16mm; ep BBC-TV arts series Arena
1985 Ligmalion: A Musical for the 80s [Nigel Finch] docudrama/89m; ep BBC-TV arts series Arena
1985 Khun Or - The Reed that Bends [David Wallace] dram doc/49m; ep BBC-TV series Global Report
1985 The Triumph of the West [ep #5 'East of Europe' dir by Ann Hummel] 13-part doc series; other ph: Derek Banks, John Else, Brian Hall, a.o.
1987 Elphida [Tunde Ikoli] tvm/60m
1989  [Spymaker -] The Secret Life of Ian Fleming [Ferdinand Fairfax] tvm; 2uc: Ronnie Maasz
1991 Prisoner of Honor [Ken Russell] tvm
1995 Roald Dahl's Little Red Riding Hood [Donald Sturrock] tvm/45m; special BBC-TV arts series 'Omnibus'
1995  Snow White: A Tale of Terror/The Grimm Brothers' Snow White/Snow White [in the Black Forest] [Michael Cohn] tvm; 2uc: Martin Grosup; opening seq ph: Arthur Wooster
1999 RKO 281 [: The Battle Over Citizen Kane] [Benjamin Ross] tvm/b&w-c; originally to be made as a feature directed by Ridley Scott
2006  The Mermaid Chair — Steven Schachter tvm; uwph: Pauline Heaton
2006 Lif'e Line [Jamie Payne] 2-part tvm
2008 U Be Dead [Jamie Payne] tvm
2010 The Little House (jamie Payne) tvm
2012 Dr Who - The Hider in the Hou (Jamie Payne) TV series

Music videos (selection)
1987 The Right Thing [a: Simply Red; d: Andy Morahan]
1987 I Want Your Sex [a: George Michael; d: Andy Morahan & George Michael]
1987 Faith [a: George Michael; d: Andy Morahan]
1988 Monkey [a: George Michael; d: Andy Morahan]
1990 Freedom '90 [a: George Michael; d: David Fincher]
1991 Auberge [a: Chris Rea; d: Nigel Dick]
1991 Cream [a: Prince; d: Rebecca Blake] cph: Deke Donelian
1991 Diamonds & Pearls [a: Prince; d: Rebecca Blake] cph: Deke Donelian
1992 One (Version 1) [a: U2; d: Anton Corbijn] b&w
1992 November Rain [a: Guns N' Roses; d: Andy Morahan] cph: Daniel Pearl
1994 Completely [a: Michael Bolton; d: Rebecca Blake]
1994 Tell Me When [a: The Human League; d: Andy Morahan]
1995 This Ain't a Love Song [a: Bon Jovi; d: Andy Morahan]
2004 No Way Out [a: Phil Collins; d: Norman Watson]
2004 Round Here [a: George Michael; d: Andy Morahan]
2011 Where I Hope You Are [a: George Michael; d: Andy Morahan]

Films as director
2000 Bubbles [short/11m] ph: Richard Terry
2002 Air Bud: Spikes Back'' [feature; + ph] see Films

External links

References 

Year of birth missing (living people)
Living people
British cinematographers